Carleton Lamont MacMillan, CM (April 18, 1903 – February 10, 1978) was a physician and political figure in Baddeck, Nova Scotia, Canada. He represented Victoria in the Nova Scotia House of Assembly from 1949 to 1967 as a Liberal member.

MacMillan was born in Goldboro, Nova Scotia. He was educated at Sydney Academy, Acadia University and Dalhousie Medical School. He set up practice in Baddeck. In 1972, he was named to the Order of Canada for a lifetime of service as a general practitioner and as a medical health officer in Nova Scotia.

MacMillan published Memoirs of a Cape Breton doctor in 1975.

References
A Guide to the Dr. Carleton Lamont MacMillan Collection, Dalhousie University Archives

Nova Scotia Liberal Party MLAs
Members of the Order of Canada
People from Baddeck, Nova Scotia
1903 births
1978 deaths
Acadia University alumni
Dalhousie University alumni